Last Call with Carson Daly is an American late-night television series that was broadcast by NBC from 2002 to 2019. Hosted by former MTV personality Carson Daly, the series was initially formatted as a late-night talk show in line with The Tonight Show and Late Night. In 2009, Last Call abandoned its studio-based format, and was retooled as an entertainment program featuring interviews and performances (such as music and stand-up comedy) filmed on-location with Daly.

Unlike other programs in NBC's late night lineup, Last Call typically recorded only 24 weeks of original shows a year, with the rest of the year being taken up by reruns.

In 2013, NBC announced that Daly would leave Last Call to become a correspondent for its morning show Today. Despite this, the show continued with Daly in a reduced capacity, serving only as a studio-based presenter for the segments (with interviews conducted by production staff off-camera). In February 2019, NBC announced that the show would conclude after its 2,000th and final episode, which aired on May 25, 2019. Reruns continued until mid-September, with its replacement—A Little Late with Lilly Singh—premiering in its timeslot on September 16, 2019.

History

2002–2006
Last Call premiered on January 8, 2002 as the successor to Later. Last Call initially aired Monday through Thursday until the cancellation of Late Friday in late May 2002; it was aired five nights a week since. Its premiere was delayed one day at the last minute due to a contract dispute.

Last Call was originally taped in Studio 8H of the GE Building in New York City, which was also the home studio of Saturday Night Live. However, this required the producers to work around the schedule of Saturday Night Live.  During this phase, Last Call had no house band and no jokes or monologue, going straight to the first guest at the beginning of the show.  The stage was set up in an empty black box theater style, save for two low-slung chairs and a small table.  Each week, a different unsigned band was brought in to do the music, in addition to any musical act at the end.  Gradually, the set acquired more furnishings and decor, much of which was influenced by the occasional week-long trips to Las Vegas. In 2003 and 2004, Last Call was nominated for a Teen Choice Award for "Choice TV Show – Late Night".

Last Call was originally planned to broadcast in high-definition when Studio 8H was retrofitted for Saturday Night Live; however, instead, the show was relocated to Los Angeles in September 2005, and continued to air in standard-definition.  After the move, Last Call began to resemble its counterparts, with a more traditional set, permanent house band led by Joe Firstman, short monologue and occasional comedy bits.

In November 2005, Joe Firstman became the official house band leader for Last Call. Notable members of his band include Kamasi Washington, Thundercat (musician), Kenny Aronoff, Mike Miley (Rival Sons), Brian Wright (musician), Zane Musa, Zane Carney, Mark Bryan, Marc Ford, and Ryan Porter. Firstman wrote the majority of the material the band performed.

2007
Production of new Last Call episodes was suspended for a month due to the Writers Guild of America strike, but on December 4, 2007, Last Call became the first late night talk show to resume production during the strike. On air, Daly explained that the only reason the show resumed production was that he was given the option to either return or have the show's 75 non-striking staff members fired. The shows were not scripted and did not include monologues. The Writers Guild of America (WGA) was critical of Daly, accusing him of crossing picket lines and labeling him a scab. Daly is not a member of the WGA.

On November 27, 2007, he was accused by the WGA of soliciting jokes for his show through a telephone hotline.

On December 11, 2007, an organized group of WGA writers attended a taping of Last Call. First, one heckled during an interview with Jerry Rice. After security removed the first writer, another spoke up disruptively, expressing sympathy with striking writers. A producer asked anyone planning to disrupt the show to leave or face prosecution; between five and twenty left.

2009
As the end of Late Night with Conan O'Brien was approaching, Daly made it public that he was interested in moving to the Late Night time slot. Jimmy Fallon was chosen to replace O'Brien, a choice that executive producer Lorne Michaels had in mind dating back to the day that Fallon left Saturday Night Live in 2004.

In February 2009, network executive Rick Ludwin told TV Week that the company was currently "going through the budgetary process with all of our shows. There are new budgetary realities... It's tough. We want to keep [Carson] going as long as we can make the budget work."  Soon after that interview, NBC announced plans for Last Call to go on a one-week "tour" of California, with taped segments of up-and-coming musical acts at various clubs, such as The Roxy, The Viper Room, and Hotel Cafe. As the show's 1000th episode approached in April, NBC's summary of the show made it clear that the change in format would continue:
"Currently in its eighth season, NBC's Last Call with Carson Daly utilizes a new style by introducing a documentary style format. Host Carson Daly gets out of the studio and takes the show on location each night. Recent highlights include Daly’s motorcycle trip across the historic Route 66, a visit to comedian Tom Green's house in the Hollywood Hills, and a scene at the Whiskey Bar with the Grammy Award-winning band Kings of Leon."
With the change, the usual late-night talk show trappings of a house band, studio audience, and comedy were abandoned. In May, NBC announced that Last Call had been renewed for a ninth season, which debuted on September 21, 2009.

2010
On January 8, 2010, it was reported by multiple media outlets that The Jay Leno Show was moving to 11:35 p.m., the Conan O'Brien-hosted Tonight Show to 12:05 a.m., and Late Night with Jimmy Fallon to 1:05, which would have resulted in Last Call losing its time slot (as NBC did not include plans to move Poker After Dark, at the time the show which followed Last Call in some markets, to a later slot). NBC confirmed the move, along with the possible end of Last Call. NBC had repeatedly emphasized that its focus is retaining the lineup of Leno, Tonight and Fallon. NBC chairman Jeff Gaspin told ABC News he expected Daly to stay with the network "in some fashion", but did not elaborate.

On January 9, after the lineup changes were first rumored in the press, Daly made an unannounced stop on Jimmy Kimmel Live!, appearing from the crowd during an audience Q&A session with Kimmel. Daly jokingly asked, "What will happen to my show?" Referencing the contestant elimination process on the show Survivor, Kimmel responded, "As long as you have your immunity idol, I think you're safe." Daly then asked, "Can I have your show?" Kimmel responded, "No."

After O'Brien was effectively forced to leave NBC and Leno was subsequently re-installed as host of The Tonight Show, Daly remained at his spot and received a 4% surge in ratings. 

On August 19, 2010, NBC and Daly confirmed that Last Call with Carson Daly would be renewed for its tenth season.

2011

In the May sweeps, Last Call received a 5% increase in viewership compared to the previous year. In the same month, next day encores of the series began to air as part of Fuse's early primetime schedule.

Despite the program being filmed in widescreen since at least 2008, Last Call was still presented in a 4:3 letterboxed format until September 19, 2011, when it became the last program (outside of the network's outside-controlled Saturday morning Qubo block at the time) on NBC's schedule to make the full conversion to high definition. This also made it the last of the major late night talk programs on broadcast and cable to make the switch.

2012–2019
On April 3, 2013, NBC officially announced that Jimmy Fallon would succeed Jay Leno as the host of The Tonight Show following the 2014 Winter Olympics. Daly was again passed over for host of Late Night when Seth Meyers was announced as Fallon's successor on May 12, 2013.

In September 2013, NBC announced that Daly was leaving Last Call to become the new social media correspondent for its morning show Today. Despite this, Daly remained involved in a limited capacity for the 13th season, only filming opening and closing segments for the program. All interviews were now conducted by the show's producers off-camera.

Though there was originally talk of expanding Fallon's Tonight Show to 90 minutes which would have bumped Last Call to 2:00 a.m. or possibly have resulted in its cancellation, the change of late night time slots did not come to pass and the show's start time remained unchanged.

Discontinuation
Its seventeenth season was its final season and at the time it was the longest-living late night weeknight show on American television with the same host. As part of the final season, Jameela Jamil hosted a recurring segment called Wide Awake with Jameela Jamil.

On February 12, 2019, NBC announced the series would end near the official end of the 2018–19 television season, with Daly citing his more prominent workload with Today, The Voice, and a new project with Golf Channel in wanting to depart the series. The 2,000th and final episode of Last Call aired on May 25, 2019, with repeats continuing until September 12, 2019. On March 14, 2019, NBC announced that Canadian YouTube personality Lilly Singh would host a new talk show to replace Last Call, A Little Late with Lilly Singh.

References

External links
 
 

2000s American late-night television series
2002 American television series debuts
2010s American late-night television series
2019 American television series endings
English-language television shows
NBC late-night programming
NBC original programming
Television series by Universal Television